Private Nurse is a 1941 American drama film directed by David Burton and written by Samuel G. Engel. The film stars Jane Darwell, Brenda Joyce, Sheldon Leonard, Robert Lowery, Ann E. Todd and Kay Linaker. The film was released on August 22, 1941, by 20th Century Fox.

Plot
A nurse gets hired to take care of a gangster's daughter whose mother recently passed away, however the daughter does not know that her father is a gangster nor that her mother is actually alive. The nurse has to be the one to deliver the truth.

Cast   
Jane Darwell as Miss Adams
Brenda Joyce as Mary Malloy
Sheldon Leonard as John Winton
Robert Lowery as Henry Hoyt
Ann E. Todd as Barbara Winton
Kay Linaker as Helene
Frank Sully as Eddie
Ferike Boros as Mrs. Sarah Goldberg
Claire Du Brey as Flower Shop Manager
Leonard Carey as Smitty
Clara Blandick as Miss Phillips
Myra Marsh as Miss Sheaffer
George Chandler as Messenger Boy
Steve O'Brien as Messenger Boy

References

External links 
 

1941 films
20th Century Fox films
American drama films
1941 drama films
Films directed by David Burton
American black-and-white films
1940s English-language films
1940s American films